The naked puffer, Sphoeroides lispus, is a species in the family Tetraodontidae, or pufferfishes. It is found in the eastern Pacific Ocean.

References

External links
 

Tetraodontidae
Fish described in 1996
Fish of the Pacific Ocean